Huanza District is one of thirty-two districts of the province Huarochirí in Peru.

Geography 
The Cordillera de la Corte traverses the district. Some of the highest peaks are Chunta and Kashpi on the northeastern border of the district. Other mountains are listed below:

Some of the largest lakes of the district are Pukaqucha, P'itiqucha, Saqsaqucha and Wask'aqucha.

References